Charlotte Tilbury MBE is a British beauty entrepreneur and makeup artist. She is the founder, chairperson, president, and chief creative officer of the makeup and skincare brand Charlotte Tilbury Beauty Ltd. Tilbury is a contributing beauty editor for British Vogue and global ambassador for Women International.

Personal and early life 
Charlotte Tilbury was born in London, England on February 10, 1973, to artist Lance Tilbury and production manager Patsy Dodd. She and her parents moved to Ibiza, Spain, when she was nine months old. When she was 13, Charlotte moved back to London to attend boarding school, where she started experimenting with makeup.

Tilbury attended the Glauca Rossi School of Makeup.

Tilbury married film producer George Waud in June 2014. She has two sons, Flynn and Valentine.

Career 
Tilbury began her career in makeup assisting Mary Greenwell, whom she had previously met at age 11 in America. She would later cite Greenwell as "an incredible mentor."

In October 2012, Tilbury launched her own YouTube channel called Charlotte Tilbury Beauty, as well as a blog called Charlotte's Beauty Secrets. On these, she posts advice about skincare and makeup tutorials. 

In 2013, Tilbury launched her beauty brand, Charlotte Tilbury Beauty Ltd. at the department store Selfridges in London, with a lineup of skincare and makeup products. The brand enjoyed early success, as Tilbury already had a large following from her YouTube channel. In November 2015, Tilbury's flagship store opened in London's Covent Garden. The products are now sold internationally. 

Tilbury's work can be seen in prestigious fashion magazines like Vogue, LOVE magazine, Vanity Fair, V magazine, usually in the form of cover shoots and editorial campaigns. Tilbury has worked with photographers including Mario Testino and Mert and Marcus, as well as celebrities such as Kate Moss, Kim Kardashian, Gisele Bündchen and human rights lawyer Amal Clooney. Tilbury also works for Fashion Week in New York, Milan, Paris, and London, acting as show makeup director for brands such as Prada, McQueen, Cavalli, Lanvin, and Chloe. In the past, Tilbury has collaborated with designers such as Tom Ford and Burberry on beauty campaigns, as well as acted as creative director for Helena Rubinstein, amongst others. 

In June 2020, Tilbury announced her partnership with Spanish fashion and fragrance company Puig. Puig acquired a majority stake in the business, with Tilbury retaining a significant minority stake, as well as continuing to be its chairman, president, and chief creative officer. The CEO, Demetra Pinsent, also retained her role.

Awards 
Tilbury was awarded an MBE in the Queen's Birthday Honours List 2018 for her services to the beauty and cosmetics industry. In addition, she was given the Rodial Award for Best Makeup Artist 2012, the CEW Achiever award in 2014, and was nominated for Veuve Clicquot Businesswoman of the Year for 2016. Tilbury has also been featured in the Business of Fashion 500 since 2013.

Tilbury's brand has won more than 300 global awards since launch, including the Walpole award for Emerging Luxury British Brand 2014, CEW Best British Brand of the Year 2015, 2016, 2018 and 2019, Best Health & Beauty eCommerce Website of the Year 2016, Vogue Best Influencer Brand, IMAGE Most Innovative Beauty Brand and #21 in the Sunday Times Fast Track 100.

Lawsuits 
In 2019, Tilbury won a lawsuit against supermarket chain Aldi, accusing them of selling a dupe of one of her products.

In 2019, actor Brooke Shields sued Tilbury for using her name without permission for one of her products. The case was dropped the same year.

References

External links 
 

Living people
British make-up artists
1973 births
British cosmetics businesspeople